Natural Mystic: The Legend Lives On is a collection of album tracks by Bob Marley, and is an addendum to the 1984 compilation album, Legend.

Lyrics 
The material on Legend consists mainly of love songs with a few of Marley's more politicized and religious themed works; the selection on Natural Mystic therefore attempts to redress the balance. On the opening title track, he warns of how "one and all got to face reality now" in a world of massive upheaval and change. Other songs explore salvation through oneness ("Africa Unite"), the greed that propels the world towards an inevitable Armageddon ("So Much Trouble In The World") and Marley's own role as a persecuted leader ("Iron Lion Zion"). The inclusion of "Easy Skanking" shows a meditative and laid-back Marley, partaking in Jamaica's most profitable cash crop during a spiritual time-out amidst the chaos of everyday life.

All tracks have been digitally remastered on GOLD version.

Alternative versions
To give Natural Mystic some individuality from its previous counterparts, the compilers placed an alternate extended cut of "Crazy Baldhead" in which more emphasis was given to the "silly noises" breakdown. They also included the remix of Bob Marley's late 1970s rendition of "Keep on Moving" featuring the vocals of Aswad and released exclusively for the UK market in 1984.  The new remix, which was intended strictly for this particular album project, was fashioned in the same way "Iron Lion Zion" was done for Songs of Freedom, and at the ending of "One Drop", the song is an alternate version and it plays a noise, possibly the noise at the ending of Bob Marley & The Wailers's "Satisfy My Soul" [released 1978 on the album "Kaya" by Tuff Gong/Island].

Credits
Original Producers: Bob Marley & The Wailers, Alex Sadkin, Steve Smith, Chris Blackwell and Lee Perry.
Compilation producers: Chris Blackwell, Trevor Wyatt and Bill Levenson.

Track listing

Original album (1995)

The Definitive Remastered edition (2002)

Charts

Weekly charts

Year-end charts

Certifications and sales

References

Bob Marley and the Wailers compilation albums
1995 compilation albums
Albums produced by Chris Blackwell
Albums produced by Lee "Scratch" Perry
Albums produced by Alex Sadkin
Island Records compilation albums
Tuff Gong albums